The Ruth Fielding books were an early Stratemeyer Syndicate series, published between 1913 and 1934 under the pseudonym Alice B. Emerson. Ruth Fielding begins the series as an orphan who comes to live with her miserly uncle and, in later titles, goes from boarding school to college and on into adulthood. Unusually for a main character in a Stratemeyer Syndicate series, Ruth Fielding marries.

Ghostwriters
Edward Stratemeyer created the series and wrote plot outlines, but the books themselves were written by a number of ghostwriters. Three authors wrote the series under the pseudonym of Alice B. Emerson: W. Bert Foster wrote titles 1 through 19; Elizabeth M. Duffield Ward wrote titles 20 through 22; and  Mildred A. Wirt Benson wrote titles 23 through 30.

Titles
 Ruth Fielding of the Red Mill; Or, Jasper Parloe's Secret, 1913
 Ruth Fielding at Briarwood Hall; Or, Solving the Campus Mystery, 1913
 Ruth Fielding at Snow Camp; Or, Lost in the Backwoods, 1913
 Ruth Fielding at Lighthouse Point; Or, Nita, the Girl Castaway, 1913
 Ruth Fielding at Silver Ranch; Or, Schoolgirls Among the Cowboys, 1913
 Ruth Fielding on Cliff Island; Or, The Old Hunter's Treasure Box, 1915
 Ruth Fielding at Sunrise Farm; Or, What Became of the Baby Orphans, 1915
 Ruth Fielding and the Gypsies; Or, The Missing Pearl Necklace, 1915
 Ruth Fielding in Moving Pictures; Or, Helping the Dormitory Fund, 1916
 Ruth Fielding Down in Dixie; Or, Great Times in the Land of Cotton, 1916
 Ruth Fielding at College; Or, The Missing Examination Papers, 1917
 Ruth Fielding in the Saddle; Or, College Girls in the Land of Gold, 1917
 Ruth Fielding in the Red Cross; Or, Doing Her Best for, Uncle Sam, 1918  
 Ruth Fielding at the War Front; Or, The Hunt for, the Lost Soldier, 1918 
 Ruth Fielding Homeward Bound; Or, A Red Cross Worker's Ocean Perils, 1919
 Ruth Fielding Down East; Or, The Hermit of Beach Plum Point, 1920
 Ruth Fielding in the Great Northwest; Or, The Indian Girl Star of the Movies, 1921
 Ruth Fielding on the St. Lawrence; Or, The Queer Old Man of the Thousand Islands, 1922
 Ruth Fielding Treasure Hunting; Or, A Moving Picture That Became Real, 1923
 Ruth Fielding in the Far North; Or, The Lost Motion Picture Company, 1924
 Ruth Fielding at Golden Pass; Or, The Perils of an Artificial Avalanche, 1925
 Ruth Fielding in Alaska; Or, The Girl Miners of Snow Mountain, 1926
 Ruth Fielding and Her Great Scenario; Or, Striving for, the Motion Picture Prize, 1927
 Ruth Fielding at Cameron Hall; Or, A Mysterious Disappearance, 1928
 Ruth Fielding Clearing Her Name; Or, The Rivals of Hollywood, 1929
 Ruth Fielding in Talking Pictures; Or, The Prisoners of the Tower, 1930
 Ruth Fielding and Baby June, 1931
 Ruth Fielding and Her Double, 1932
 Ruth Fielding and Her Greatest Triumph; Or, Saving Her Company from Disaster, 1933
 Ruth Fielding and Her Crowning Victory; Or, Winning Honors Abroad, 1934

References

Further reading
 Emerson, Alice B. Ruth Fielding of the Red Mill https://www.gutenberg.org/files/4985/4985-h/4985-h.htm
 Emerson, Alice B. Ruth Fielding at Briarwood Hall https://www.gutenberg.org/files/29203/29203-h/29203-h.htm
 Emerson, Alice B. Ruth Fielding at Snow Camp https://www.gutenberg.org/cache/epub/6851/pg6851-images.html
 Emerson, Alice B. Ruth Fielding at Lighthouse Point https://www.gutenberg.org/files/34024/34024-h/34024-h.htm
 Emerson, Alice B. Ruth Fielding at Silver Ranch https://www.gutenberg.org/files/36398/36398-h/36398-h.htm
 Emerson, Alice B. Ruth Fielding on Cliff Island https://www.gutenberg.org/files/14630/14630-h/14630-h.htm
 Emerson, Alice B. Ruth Fielding at Sunrise Farm https://www.gutenberg.org/files/36397/36397-h/36397-h.htm
 Emerson, Alice B. Ruth Fielding and the Gypsies https://www.gutenberg.org/files/22743/22743-h/22743-h.htm
 Emerson, Alice B. Ruth Fielding in Moving Pictures https://www.gutenberg.org/files/14635/14635-h/14635-h.htm
 Emerson, Alice B. Ruth Fielding Down in Dixie https://www.gutenberg.org/files/36747/36747-h/36747-h.htm
 Emerson, Alice B. Ruth Fielding at College https://www.gutenberg.org/files/26613/26613-h/26613-h.htm
 Emerson, Alice B. Ruth Fielding in the Saddle https://www.gutenberg.org/files/36396/36396-h/36396-h.htm
 Emerson, Alice B. Ruth Fielding in the Red Cross https://www.gutenberg.org/files/36395/36395-h/36395-h.htm
 Emerson, Alice B. Ruth Fielding at the War Front https://www.gutenberg.org/files/20834/20834-h/20834-h.htm
 Emerson, Alice B. Ruth Fielding Homeward Bound https://www.gutenberg.org/files/36748/36748-h/36748-h.htm
 Emerson, Alice B. Ruth Fielding Down East https://www.gutenberg.org/files/23116/23116-h/23116-h.htm
 Emerson, Alice B. Ruth Fielding in the Great Northwest https://www.gutenberg.org/files/15720/15720-h/15720-h.htm
 Emerson, Alice B. Ruth Fielding on the St. Lawrence https://www.gutenberg.org/files/25802/25802-h/25802-h.htm

External links

 Ruth Fielding Books at Faded Page (Canada)

Stratemeyer Syndicate
Juvenile series
Fielding, Ruth